Blaise Compaoré (born 3 February 1951) is a Burkinabé-Ivorian former politician who served as the second president of Burkina Faso from 1987 to 2014. He was a close associate of the first president, Thomas Sankara, during the 1980s, and in October 1987, he led a coup d'état during which Sankara was killed. Subsequently, he introduced a policy of 'rectification', overturning the leftist and Third Worldist policies pursued by Sankara. He won elections in 1991, 1998, 2005 and 2010, in what were considered unfair circumstances. His attempt to amend the constitution to extend his 27-year term caused the 2014 Burkinabé uprising. On 31 October 2014, Compaoré resigned, whereupon he fled to the Ivory Coast.

Early career 
Compaoré was born in Ziniaré, Upper Volta on 3 February 1951. His father was a military veteran. He studied at a Catholic school in Fada N'gourma, followed by a Lycée in Ouagadougou. His mother died suddenly when he was 15, an event which was followed by the death of his father several years later. Compaoré subsequently became very close to the family of Thomas Sankara, whose father Joseph treated him as his son. After being expelled from the Lycée, Compaoré underwent basic military training. During his service he decided to pursue a military career, continuing his studies at the Yaoundé Military Academy in Cameroon. There he became acquainted with Henri Zongo and labor union leader Soumane Touré. Following the end of the 1974 Agacher Strip border clashes between Upper Volta and Mali, Compaoré was posted north of Ouahigouya. There he met Thomas Sankara with whom he developed a close friendship.

Compaoré played a major role in the coups d'état against Saye Zerbo and Jean-Baptiste Ouedraogo. He has been married to Chantal Compaoré (née Chantal Terrasson de Fougères) since 1985.

Under Sankara's leadership, which lasted from 1983 to 1987, Compaoré was his deputy and was a member of the National Revolutionary Council. He served as Minister of State at the Presidency and subsequently as Minister of State for Justice.

Politics 
Compaoré was involved in the 1983 and 1987 coups, taking power after the second in which his predecessor Sankara was killed. He was elected as the president of Burkina Faso in 1991, in an election that was boycotted by the opposition, and re-elected in 1998, 2005 and 2010.

1983 coup 

At the age of 33, Compaoré organized a coup d'état, which deposed Major Jean-Baptiste Ouedraogo on 4 August 1983. The coup d'état was supported by Libya, which was, at the time, on the verge of war with France in Chad. Other key participants were Captain Henri Zongo, Major Jean-Baptiste Boukary Lingani and the charismatic Captain Thomas Sankara—who was pronounced President.

During the Agacher Strip War with Mali in December 1985, Compaoré commanded Burkinabé soldiers who split into small groups and employed guerrilla tactics against Malian tanks.

1987 coup 

Compaoré took power on 15 October 1987 in a coup during which Sankara was killed. Deteriorating relations with France and neighboring Ivory Coast was the reason given for the coup. Compaoré described the killing of Sankara as an 'accident', but the circumstances have never been properly investigated. Upon taking the presidency, he reverted many of the policies of Sankara, claiming that his policy was a 'rectification' of the Burkinabé revolution.

He initially ruled in a triumvirate with Henri Zongo and Jean-Baptiste Boukary Lingani: in September 1989 these two were arrested, charged with plotting to overthrow the government, summarily tried and executed.

1991 and 1998 elections 

Compaoré was elected as the president of Burkina Faso in 1991, in an election boycotted by the main opposition parties in protest at the questionable means Compaoré had used to take office in the first place. Only 25 percent of the electorate voted. In 1998, he was re-elected for the first time. In 2003, numerous alleged plotters were arrested, following accusations of a coup plot against Compaoré. In August 2005, he announced his intention to contest the next presidential election. Opposition politicians regarded this as unconstitutional due to a constitutional amendment in 2000 limiting a president to two terms and reducing term lengths from seven to five years. Compaoré's supporters disputed this, saying that the amendment could not be applied retroactively, and in October 2005, the constitutional council ruled that because Compaoré was a sitting president in 2000, the amendment would not apply until the end of his second term in office, thereby allowing him to present his candidacy for the 2005 election.

2005 election 

On 13 November 2005, Compaoré was re-elected as president, defeating 12 opponents and winning 80.35 percent of the vote. Although sixteen opposition parties announced a coalition to unseat Compaoré early on in the race, ultimately nobody wanted to give up their spot in the race to another leader in the coalition, and the pact fell through.

Following Compaoré's victory, he was sworn in for another term on 20 December 2005.

2011 protests 

On 14 April 2011, Compaoré was reported to have fled from the capital Ouagadougou to his hometown of Ziniare after mutineering military bodyguards began a revolt in their barracks reportedly over unpaid allowances. Their actions eventually spread to the presidential compound and other army bases. In the night, gunfire was reported at the presidential compound and an ambulance was seen leaving the compound. Soldiers also looted shops in the city through the night.

2014 uprising 

In June 2014 Compaoré's ruling party, the Congress for Democracy and Progress (CDP), called on him to organise a referendum that would allow him to alter the constitution in order to seek re-election in 2015. Otherwise, he would be forced to step down due to term limits.

On 30 October 2014, the National Assembly was scheduled to debate an amendment to the constitution that would have enabled Compaoré to stand for re-election as president in 2015. Opponents protested against this by storming the parliament building in Ouagadougou, starting fires inside it and looting offices. Billowing smoke was reported by the BBC to be coming from the building. Opposition spokesman Pargui Emile Paré of the People's Movement for Socialism / Federal Party described the protests as 'Burkina Faso's black spring (sic), like the Arab spring (sic)'.

Compaoré reacted to the events by shelving the proposed constitutional changes, dissolving the government, declaring a state of emergency and offering to work with the opposition to resolve the crisis. Later in the day, the military, under General Honore Traore, announced that it would install a transitional government 'in consultation with all parties' and that the National Assembly was dissolved; he foresaw 'a return to the constitutional order' within a year. He did not make clear what role, if any, he envisioned for Compaoré during the transitional period. Compaoré said that he was prepared to leave office at the end of the transition.

On 31 October, Compaoré announced he had left the presidency and that there was a 'power vacuum'. He also called for a 'free and transparent' election within 90 days. Presidential guard officer Yacouba Isaac Zida then took over as head of state in an interim capacity. It was reported that a heavily armed convoy believed to be carrying Compaoré was traveling towards the southern town of Pô. However, it diverted before reaching the town and he then fled to Ivory Coast with the support of President Alassane Ouattara.

A week later, Jeune Afrique published an interview with Compaoré in which he alleged that 'part of the opposition was working with the army' to plot his overthrow and that 'history will tell us if they were right'. He added that he would 'not wish for his worst enemy' to be in Zida's place.

The first head of state that has been in office for more than a short time after Blaise Campaoré is Roch Marc Christian Kaboré as of 29 December 2015.

Liberian Civil War 

Compaoré introduced Charles Taylor to his friend Muammar Gaddafi. Compaoré also helped Taylor in the early 1990s by sending him troops and resources.

International and regional roles 

In 1993, Compaoré headed the Burkina-Faso delegation that participated in the first Tokyo International Conference on African Development.

Compaoré has been active as a mediator in regional issues. On 26 July 2006, he was designated as the mediator of the Inter-Togolese Dialogue, which was held in Ouagadougou in August 2006 and resulted in an agreement between the government and opposition parties. He has also acted as mediator in the crisis in Ivory Coast, brokering the peace agreement signed by the Ivorian president, Laurent Gbagbo, and the New Forces leader, Guillaume Soro, in Ouagadougou on 4 March 2007. In March 2012, he acted as a mediator in talks between representatives of the Malian coup d'état and other regional leaders.

The BBC noted in 2014 that he was 'the strongest ally to France and the US in the region' and that 'despite his own history of backing rebels and fuelling civil wars in the West African neighbourhood ... more importantly, he used his networks to help Western powers battling Islamist militancy in the Sahel'.

During 2016, the capital was in the grip of a terrorist attack. Jihadists who had suites and tables in town, following agreements with Campaoré of non-aggression. As a result, the military group of the presidential guard received enormous credits while the army was impoverished to avoid any military coup.

He served on the International Multilateral Partnership Against Cyber Threats (IMPACT) International Advisory Board.

Views on sexuality 
In an interview with the magazine Famille Chrétienne, Compaoré asserted that the notion of sexual abstinence was not a monopoly of the Roman Catholic Church and that European non-governmental organizations that disagreed with traditional morality were profiting from the situation to intervene in regional African affairs.

Indictment 
In April 2021, a military court in Burkina Faso indicted Compaoré in absentia, charging him with the murder of his immediate predecessor, Thomas Sankara, in 1987. Another trial against him, on counts of attacking state security, concealing a corpse and complicity in a murder, began on 11 October 2021. In April 2022, he was found guilty and sentenced to life in prison.

References

Sources

Further reading

External links 

 
 Pascal Drouhaud interviews Blaise Compaoré
 Reporters Without Borders, Burkina Faso 2004 Annual Report
 IFEX: Monitoring media freedom in Burkina Faso
 

|-

|-

|-

1951 births
Burkinabé military personnel
Congress for Democracy and Progress politicians
Exiled Burkinabé politicians
Government ministers of Burkina Faso
Heads of state of Burkina Faso
Leaders ousted by a coup
Leaders who took power by coup
Living people
People from Plateau-Central Region
21st-century Burkinabé people